Gaius Claudius Marcellus (88 BC – May 40 BC) was a Roman senator who served as Consul in 50 BC. He was a friend to Roman senator Cicero and an early opponent of Julius Caesar.

He was also noteworthy for marrying the sister of the future emperor Augustus, Octavia the Younger, with whom he fathered M. Marcellus, who was for a while Augustus' intended heir.

Biography

Early life
He was a direct descendant of consul Marcus Claudius Marcellus. His grandfather was also named Marcus; his father was Gaius and his mother was named Junia.

Family
By 54 BC Marcellus had married Octavia the Younger, a great-niece of Julius Caesar (and sister of future emperor Augustus), in an arranged ceremony. Octavia bore Marcellus three known surviving children: a son, Marcus, and two daughters and Claudia Marcella Major and Claudia Marcella Minor, born in Rome. However, according to the anonymous Περὶ τοῦ καισαρείου γένους Octavia bore Marcellus four sons and four daughters.

Because of Marcellus relatively advanced age at the time of his marriage to Octavia, it has been suspected by Ronald Syme that he might have been married before to a woman who is not attested. Christian Settipani has speculated that Marcellus might have had a daughter who married the Roman senator Sextus Quinctilius Varus (who served as a Quaestor in 49 BC) by an earlier wife. This Claudia Marcella would then have become mother of Publius Quinctilius Varus and his three sisters.

Opposition to Julius Caesar
In 54 BC the great-uncle of Octavia, Julius Caesar, was said to be anxious for Octavia to divorce Marcellus so that she could marry Pompey, his rival and son-in-law who had just lost his wife Julia (daughter of Caesar and thus Octavia's cousin once removed). However, Pompey apparently declined the proposal and Octavia's husband continued to oppose Julius Caesar, culminating in the crucial year of his consulship in 50 BC when he tried to recall Julius Caesar from his ten-year governorship in Gaul two years early, without his army, in an attempt to save the Roman Republic. Failing this, he called unsuccessfully upon Caesar to resign.

He also obstructed Caesar from standing for a second consulship in absentia, insisting that he should return to Rome to stand, thereby forgoing the protection of his armies in Gaul. When Caesar finally invaded Italy in 49 BC, Marcellus, unlike his brother and nephew, did not take up arms against him. Caesar subsequently pardoned him.

Later years
In 46 BC, with the help of other senators including Cicero (in the latter's Pro Marcello), Gaius was able to intercede with Caesar for his cousin  M. Claudius Marcellus, a former consul of 51 BC and a fervent anti-Caesarian, who was at the time living in exile in Mytilene. Gaius died in May 40 BC; five months later, his widow, Octavia, married the triumvir Mark Antony.

References

External links

 Roman coinage of Gaius Claudius Marcellus
 

88 BC births
40 BC deaths
1st-century BC Roman consuls
Gaius (consul 704 AUC)
Optimates
Senators of the Roman Republic